is the ninth compilation album by Japanese entertainer Miho Nakayama. Released through King Records on April 7, 1997, the album compiles 15 songs selected by Nakayama from her past recordings, including her final top-10 hit "Mirai e no Present" (featuring Mayo). The initial release of the album came with an 88-page hardcover photo book containing her full discography and videography from 1985 to 1996.

The album peaked at No. 3 on Oricon's albums chart. It sold over 333,000 copies and was certified Gold by the RIAJ.

Track listing

Charts

Certification

References

External links
 
 
 

1997 compilation albums
Miho Nakayama compilation albums
Japanese-language compilation albums
King Records (Japan) compilation albums